Henry Sampson  was  Provost of Oriel College, Oxford, from 1449 to 1476.

Citations

Provosts of Oriel College, Oxford
Year of birth missing
Year of death missing